Yüksek Hızlı Tren or YHT is a high-speed rail service in Turkey, operated by TCDD Taşımacılık, and is the railway's premier intercity train service. As of 2022, the network spans  and services major cities like Istanbul, Ankara, Eskişehir, İzmit and Konya. Expansion of the system is underway and the network is expected to reach Sivas, Edirne, Afyonkarahisar, Adana and İzmir in the 2020s. 

High-speed rail in Turkey was originally planned to be built as early as 1975, but it wasn't until 2003 when the construction of the Ankara-Istanbul high-speed railway began. The first section was completed in 2007, between Eskişehir and Esenkent with passenger operations beginning on 13 March 2009 between Eskişehir and Ankara. On 23 August 2011, the Turkish State Railways inaugurated its second high-speed railway to Konya and on 25 July 2014, the railway was opened to Istanbul. The State Railways have integrated the YHT network with other projects done in major urban areas. In Ankara, the route was expanded from three tracks to five tracks to allow for frequent Başkentray commuter rail service, along with a new high-speed rail concourse at Ankara station. In Istanbul, YHT trains use the Marmaray Tunnel to traverse the Bosphorus strait and reach the European side of the city.

The latest expansion of the network happened on 8 January 2022, with a  expansion from Konya to Karaman, along the upgraded Konya-Yenice railway.

History

Origins
Istanbul and Ankara are Turkey's largest two cities, having a combined population over 16,500,000. Transportation between the two cities is high. The Otoyol 4 motorway is a major highway between the two cities, and the Ankara–Istanbul route is the busiest domestic air route in the country. The route between Istanbul and Ankara by rail has been a single-track line, and trains usually were delayed 30 minutes to 2 hours plus the average 7 hours, 30 minutes travel time. Rail transport in Turkey was already at its lowest point, so in 2003 the State Railways and the Turkish Ministry of Transport made an agreement to build a  line between the two cities. The line would be an electrified double trackline. Construction began in 2004 from Esenkent to Eskişehir. The line was completed on 23 April 2007.

Testing

On 28 February 2007 TCDD requested bids for high-speed train sets from other networks to be tested on the completed portion of the high-speed line.

On 30 March 2007 TCDD signed an agreement with Trenitalia of Ferrovie dello Stato to rent an ETR 500 train set for 4 months.

The first run was from Haydarpaşa Terminal in Istanbul to the Central Station in Ankara, using the completed portion of the high-speed line between Hasanbey and Esenkent.

On 14 September 2007 the ETR 500 Y2 set a speed record in Turkey, reaching . This test received extensive media coverage in Turkey.

On 20 November 2007 the first TCDD HT65000 high-speed train sets purchased from CAF of Spain entered Turkey from the Kapıkule border station in Edirne, and tests were subsequently made with these trains prior to the commencement of services on 13 March 2009.

In 2010 one of the YHT trains was converted into a test train in order to test and measure the new lines. The Transportation Ministry spent 14 million TL (around 7 million Euros at that time) for the installation of testing and measuring equipment on the train, which it named – because it is a tradition to give a name to test trains – as "Piri Reis" after the renowned Turkish admiral and cartographer who drew some of the most accurate and detailed maps of the Mediterranean Sea and the Americas in the early 16th century.

Naming
TCDD requested bids for the name of the high-speed service. Out of over 100 entries, the ones with the highest votes were: Türk Yıldızı (Turkish Star), Turkuaz (Turquoise), Yüksek Hızlı Tren (High Speed Train), Çelik Kanat (Steel Wing) and Yıldırım (Lightning). TCDD chose Yüksek Hızlı Tren to be the name of the service.

Opening
On 13 March 2009 the inaugural ceremony took place in Ankara; attended by President Abdullah Gül, Prime Minister Recep Tayyip Erdoğan, and Minister of Transport Binali Yıldırım, who started the first phase of the YHT service between Ankara and Eskişehir.

Ridership 

Until 2015, ridership had grown at the expense of TCDD's regular train services and has not dented air traffic demand.  Total TCDD services incl. HSR remain flat. Traffic was affected since 2012 all services to Istanbul were suspended. A sharp increase in ridership occurred after extra high speed trains started operation. A further increase in 2018 and 2019 is expected with new trainsets becoming operational and the opening of the Istanbul terminals Halkali and Haydarpasa.

Lines in operation

Ankara-Eskişehir
Ankara to Eskişehir service was the first YHT and high-speed rail route in Turkey, entering service on 13 March 2009. The route has the most frequent train service of the whole YHT network, with 13 daily trains in each direction, 8 of which continue to Istanbul, while only 5 daily trains operate just between the two cities. The average journey time is 1 hour and 29 minutes.

Ankara-Istanbul

Before the YHT came into operation, average journey time between İstanbul and Ankara was 7 hours and 30 minutes. By transferring from the YHT to intercity trains at Eskişehir, average journey time between İstanbul and Ankara has fallen to 5 hours and 30 minutes. After the completion of the second phase of the Ankara-Istanbul high-speed railway (Eskişehir-Istanbul) in 2013, some journeys between Ankara and Eskişehir were extended to Istanbul and YHT started running on the Ankara-Istanbul (Pendik) route on 26 July 2014. The journey is now reduced to as little as 3 hours 49 minutes.

Ankara-Karaman

The route was put into service on 23 August 2011 on the second high-speed railway line being constructed in Turkey. With its inauguration, the journey time between these two cities hugely decreased (mainly because of the absence of direct railway link between the cities).

Istanbul-Karaman
The line was put into service on 17 December 2021. It stops at every stations on its route in which YHT service in present. The average journey time is about 4 hours and 17 minutes.

Lines under construction

Turkey's high-speed rail network is expanding, with three more high-speed railways under construction and several more planned.

Ankara-Sivas

Ankara to Sivas high-speed rail service is expected to begin operation in mid-2020. The  route will reduce travel time between the two cities from 9 hours and 30 minutes to 2 hours and 50 minutes. The railway will use a straighter route to Sivas, through Yozgat, bypassing Kayseri. Direct service from Istanbul to Sivas is also planned upon opening with an expected journey time of around 5 hours.

Sivas–Kars line
An extension eastwards to Kars from the Ankara – Sivas line is planned (a feasibility study done in 2006), passing through Erzincan and Erzurum. The line is expected to be built in three phases. It will be electrified and double-tracked based on the 250 km/h standard.

Sivas–Erzincan line construction will start in 2018.

Ankara-Afyon-İzmir

Ankara to İzmir high-speed rail service has been talked about since construction of the Ankara-Istanbul high-speed railway began. The route will diverge off the Polatlı-Konya high-speed railway just south of Polatlı junction and head west, through Afyonkarahisar. The railway will connect to the İzmir-Afyon railway at Manisa and continue into İzmir together with other trains. A second route into İzmir though Kemalpaşa is also planned. This route would diverge off the railway west of Turgutlu and enter İzmir from the east. The line would run underground, parallel with the Halkapınar—Otogar Line of the İzmir Metro, connecting to the existing railway at Halkapınar in the city center.

Bilecik–Bursa-Bandırma high-speed line

A new line between Bursa and Bilecik Osmaneli is planned to connect with the Ankara–Istanbul high-speed line; contracts were awarded in 2011 and construction is expected to start in 2012. The line is expected to open in 2023, and would be capable of 250 km/h operation. The project was revised and extended to Bandırma in summer 2020. The total length of revised line is 201 km.

İstanbul–Edirne–Kapıkule–Svilengrad (Bulgaria) high-speed line
The Ankara to Istanbul high-speed line is to be extended 230 km from Halkalı (a western suburb of Istanbul) all the way to Turkey's borders with Bulgaria and Greece at the vicinity of Kapıkule in the Edirne Province.  Travel times will be reduced from 5 hours to 1 hour assuming non-stop journey between Istanbul terminus and the border post. 

Construction began in 2019 and is expected to be finished by 2022.

One-third of the budgeted investment has been done and is planned to be completed by 2020.

For high-speed trains, TCDD has a budget of more than 1  billion TL for 2014.

According to the official (budgeted) and unofficial (announced) plans, 45 of 81 provincial seats will be connected by high-speed services in the long term.

Lines under planning

Antalya–Konya–Kayseri high-speed line
This line is planned as a section of the Ankara–Antalya high-speed line. The line will used for Ankara–Antalya high-speed line.

Eskişehir-Afyon-Antalya high-speed line

Ordu-Samsun-Çorum-Kırıkkale-Ankara high-speed line

Connection to Sabiha Gökçen Airport and Istanbul Aırport

Related infrastructure projects

The Marmaray project, which consists of a rail transport network around Istanbul and the world's deepest immersed tube railway tunnel under the Bosphorus strait, is also under construction. The Marmaray tunnel will connect the railway lines on the European and Asian parts of Istanbul and Turkey. In 2013 the Marmaray tunnel was opened and passenger transportation is started partially in 13.5 km of total 76.5 km. The rest was expected to be completed by 2015, but it now looks like this will not happen until some time in 2016.
The project connecting the European and Asian suburban railway lines, will also connect the Thracian and Anatolian high-speed railway lines in Turkey via the world's deepest immersed-tube railway tunnel across the Bosphorus strait. 

A new high-speed rail terminus station is to be built in Ankara (2009–2010), which is to be funded as a public–private partnership, using the Build-Operate-Transfer model. Additionally, new stations are to be constructed in İstanbul, Izmir, Edirne, Trabzon, Erzurum, Erzincan, Sivas, Kayseri, Antalya, Afyon and Polatlı.
Furthermore, an additional project called Başkentray is also underway which consist of the renewal of railways in the urban section of Ankara.

Service and Operation

Speed limitations

Naturally, some speed restrictions also apply in urban sections while accessing the central station, especially in Ankara and Istanbul thus increasing journey times. The speed on these sections is expected to increase once renewal projects in urban areas (like Başkentray and second phase of Marmaray) are completed.

Staff, operation and security

On YHT service, there is usually one train engineer (two on some trains), a train manager (absent in some trips), two train attendants and a café car attendant. Business-class passengers are served meals at their seats if they applied for while buying their tickets. When accessing the trains, passengers must pass a security check like in airports. Maintenance of the sets is done at the Eryaman Yard in Ankara.

Trains

Currently, there are several series of high-speed trains that run the YHT service:
 TCDD HT65000, manufactured by CAF, similar to CAF Cepia series.
 TCDD HT80000, manufactured by Siemens, marketed globally under the brand Siemens Velaro. Turkey also signed contract for ten more Velaro trains. With this contract, the Turkish Velaro fleet will grow to 17 trains.

Every set has railroad cars with cabins in the front and rear car, cars for economy class passengers and car(s) for first class passengers. Additionally, some HT80000 sets have business class cabins with 4 seats. The seating arrangements are 3 seats in a row (1 on one side, 2 on the other side) in first class and 4 seats in a row (2 on each side) in economy class. Automatic sliding doors provide passage between cars. Baggage may be stowed in the overhead compartments above the seats, or underneath the seats. Wi-Fi service is available with power inputs for laptops in first and business classes and all sets are wheelchair-accessible (with places in economy class only).
In economy class, seats are fabric-coated and have audio connectors and foldable tables. In first class, there are leather-coated seats and a visual and audio broadcasting system that can broadcast at least 4 hours on 4 different channels.

See also
 TGV
 AVE
 Intercity Express
 Le Frecce
 High-speed rail in Turkey
 List of high-speed railway lines

External links
TCDD Official Site (In Turkish)
TCDD English Site

Notes

References

Named passenger trains of Turkey
High-speed trains of Turkey
Turkish State Railways
Passenger trains running at least at 250 km/h in commercial operations